Seemi Pasha is a Pakistani film and television actress, former model, from Lahore. She is best known for portraying the roles of mothers in Pakistani television series. Her prominent appearances include Sanjha, Shehr-e-Zaat, Kahi Unkahi, Rishtay Kuch Adhooray Se, Mere Khuda, Khaani, Ishqiya, Malaal-e-Yaar and Fitrat.

Filmography

Films
Rangreza (2017)

Television

References

External links 
 

Living people
Pakistani television actresses
1959 births
21st-century Pakistani actresses